Rani Bagh is a residential area located in the northwest part of Delhi, India. It is situated quite near to Pitam Pura, Saraswati Vihar, Engineer's enclave, Raja Park, Lok Vihar, Sant Nagar, Rani Bagh and Punjabi Bagh. It is well connected to various parts of Delhi and it also connects with both inner and outer ring roads of Delhi. It's an urban area where you will find Rani Bagh Market, commercial complex, shopping malls like Aggarwal City Mall (M2K PitamPura), Chunmun, More Superstore and restaurants such as Dominos, BTW and many more. Rani Bagh Market is one of the big markets of Delhi.

Subdivisions
The various neighborhoods included inside Rani Bagh are Mahindra Park, Multani Mohalla, Raja Park, Saraswati Vihar and Rishi Nagar.
It is located near the Rohini zone and famous for its Rani-Bagh market. Metro feeder bus facilities connects with Pitampura, Netaji Subhash Palace and Kirti Nagar Metro Stations.

References

Neighbourhoods in Delhi